Snønutryggen is a broad, ice-covered ridge rising southeast of Snønutane Peaks in the Mühlig-Hofmann Mountains of Queen Maud Land. It was mapped by Norwegian cartographers from surveys and air photos by the Norwegian Antarctic Expedition (1956–60) and named Snønutryggen ("the snow peak ridge").

References

Ridges of Queen Maud Land
Princess Astrid Coast